Verma modules, named after Daya-Nand Verma, are objects in the representation theory of Lie algebras, a branch of mathematics.

Verma modules can be used in the classification of irreducible representations of a complex semisimple Lie algebra. Specifically, although Verma modules themselves are infinite dimensional, quotients of them can be used to construct finite-dimensional representations with highest weight , where  is dominant and integral. Their homomorphisms correspond to invariant differential operators over flag manifolds.

Informal construction

We can explain the idea of a Verma module as follows. Let  be a fixed set of positive roots. For each , choose a nonzero element  for the corresponding root space  and a nonzero element  in the root space . We think of the 's as "raising operators" and the 's as "lowering operators."

Now let  be an arbitrary linear functional, not necessarily dominant or integral. The Verma module is one particular such highest-weight module, one that is maximal in the sense that every other highest-weight module with highest weight  is a quotient of the Verma module. It will turn out that Verma modules are always infinite dimensional; if  is dominant integral, however, one can construct a finite-dimensional quotient module of the Verma module.

We now attempt to understand intuitively what the Verma module with highest weight  should look like. Since  is to be a highest weight vector with weight , we certainly want 

and
.

Then  should be spanned elements obtained by lowering  by the action of the 's:
.
We now impose only those relations among vectors of the above form required by the commutation relations among the 's. In particular, the Verma module is always infinite-dimensional.

A simple re-ordering argument shows that there is only one possible way the full Lie algebra  can act on this space.

as a linear combination of products of Lie algebra elements with the raising operators  acting first, the elements of the Cartan subalgebra, and last the lowering operators .

Then by a simple re-ordering argument, every element of the above form can be rewritten as a linear combination of elements with the 's in a specific order:
,
where the 's are non-negative integers. Actually, it turns out that such vectors form a basis for the Verma module.

Although this description of the Verma module gives an intuitive idea of what  looks like, it still remains to give a rigorous construction of it. In any case, the Verma module gives—for any , not necessarily dominant or integral—a representation with highest weight . The price we pay for this relatively simple construction is that  is always infinite dimensional. In the case where  is dominant and integral, one can construct a finite-dimensional, irreducible quotient of the Verma module.

The case of sl(2; C)
Let  be the usual basis for :

Then the Verma module with highest weight  is spanned by linearly independent vectors  and the action of the basis elements is as follows:
.
(This means in particular that  and that .)

In this construction,  is an arbitrary complex number, not necessarily real or positive or an integer. Nevertheless, the case where  is a non-negative integer is special. In that case, the span of the vectors  is easily seen to be invariant—because .

Definition of Verma modules
There are two standard constructions of the Verma module, both of which involve the concept of universal enveloping algebra. We continue the notation of the previous section:  is a complex semisimple Lie algebra,  is a fixed Cartan subalgebra,  is the associated root system with a fixed set  of positive roots.

As a quotient of the enveloping algebra
Since the Verma module is supposed to be a -module, it will also be a -module, by the universal property of the enveloping algebra. Thus, if we have a Verma module  with highest weight vector , there will be a linear map  from  into  given by
. 
Since, also,  is supposed to be a weight vector with weight , the kernel of  should include all vectors of the form
.

The previous discussion motivates the following construction of Verma module. We define  as the quotient vector space
,
where  is the left ideal generated by all elements of the form 

and
.
Thus,  is a -module and therefore also a -module.

By extension of scalars
The "extension of scalars" procedure is a method for changing a left module  over one algebra  (not necessarily commutative) into a left module over a larger algebra  that contains  as a subalgebra.
.
Now, since  is a left -module over itself, the above tensor product carries a left module structure over the larger algebra , uniquely determined by the requirement that

Thus, starting from the left -module , we have produced a left -module .

We now apply this construction in the setting of a semisimple Lie algebra. We can form a left module  over the universal enveloping algebra  as follows:
.
The motivation for this formula is that it describes how  is supposed to act on the highest weight vector in a Verma module.

Thus, we may apply the extension of scalars technique to convert  from a left -module into a left -module  as follow:
 .

The structure of the Verma module
Whichever construction of the Verma module is used, one has to prove that it is nontrivial, i.e., not the zero module.
 

Basic properties
Verma modules, considered as -modules, are highest weight modules, i.e. they are generated by a highest weight vector.
the unit in the field , considered as the -module
) and it has weight .

Multiplicities
Verma modules are weight modules, i.e.  is a direct sum of all its weight spaces.

Universal property
Verma modules have a very important property: If  is any representation generated by a highest weight vector of weight , there is a surjective -homomorphism  That is, all representations with highest weight  that are generated by the highest weight vector (so called highest weight modules) are quotients of

Irreducible quotient module
 contains a unique maximal submodule, and its quotient is the unique (up to isomorphism) irreducible representation with highest weight  If the highest weight  is dominant and integral, one then proves that this irreducible quotient is actually finite dimensional.

As an example, consider the case  discussed above. If the highest weight  is "dominant integral"—meaning simply that it is a non-negative integer—then  and the span of the elements  is invariant. The quotient representation is then irreducible with dimension . The quotient representation is spanned by linearly independent vectors .

The Verma module  itself is irreducible if and only if  is antidominant.

Other properties
The Verma module  is called regular, if its highest weight λ is on the affine Weyl orbit of a dominant weight . In other word, there exist an element w of the Weyl group W such that

where  is the affine action of the Weyl group.

The Verma module  is called singular, if there is no dominant weight on the affine orbit of λ. In this case, there exists a weight  so that  is on the wall of the fundamental Weyl chamber (δ is the sum of all fundamental weights).

Homomorphisms of Verma modules
For any two weights  a non-trivial homomorphism

This follows easily from the Harish-Chandra theorem on infinitesimal central characters.

Each homomorphism of Verma modules is injective and the dimension

for any .

The full classification of Verma module homomorphisms was done by Bernstein–Gelfand–Gelfand and Verma and can be summed up in the following statement:

 There exists a nonzero homomorphism  if and only if there exists 
a sequence of weights

and

where  is the affine action of the Weyl group. If the weights are further integral, then there exists a nonzero homomorphism

if and only if

in the Bruhat ordering of the Weyl group.

Jordan–Hölder series
Let 

be a sequence of -modules so that the quotient B/A is irreducible with highest weight μ. Then there exists a nonzero homomorphism .

An easy consequence of this is, that for any highest weight modules  such that

there exists a nonzero homomorphism .

Bernstein–Gelfand–Gelfand resolution
Let  be a finite-dimensional irreducible representation of the Lie algebra  with highest weight λ. We know from the section about homomorphisms of Verma modules that there exists a homomorphism

if and only if

in the Bruhat ordering of the Weyl group.

There exists an exact sequence of -homomorphisms
 
where n is the length of the largest element of the Weyl group.

A similar resolution exists for generalized Verma modules as well. It is denoted shortly as the BGG resolution.

See also
Classifying finite-dimensional representations of Lie algebras
Theorem of the highest weight
Generalized Verma module
Weyl module

Notes

References

.
.

.
.

.

Representation theory of Lie algebras